Daemonic is a novel by Stephen Laws published by Hodder & Stoughton in 1995.

Plot summary
Daemonic is a novel in which reclusive business tycoon and horror movie producer Jack Draegerman offers a large amount of money to a group of people to visit him in his mansion.

Reception
Jonathan Palmer reviewed Daemonic for Arcane magazine, rating it a 3 out of 10 overall. Palmer comments that "Daemonic is the name of the book you should avoid. Diabolical might have been more apt."

Reviews
Review by Stephen Payne (1996) in Vector 189

References

1995 British novels
Hodder & Stoughton books